Virginia's 3rd Senate district is one of 40 districts in the Senate of Virginia. It has been represented by Republican Tommy Norment, currently the Senate Minority Leader, since 1992.

Geography
District 3 is located largely on the Virginia Peninsula and Middle Peninsula along the Chesapeake Bay coastline, including all of Poquoson, Gloucester County, King and Queen County, King William County and New Kent County, as well as parts of Hampton, Suffolk, Isle of Wight County, James City County, Surry County and York County.

The district overlaps with Virginia's 1st, 2nd, and 3rd congressional districts, and with the 64th, 76th, 91st, 93rd, 96th, 97th, and 98th districts of the Virginia House of Delegates.

Recent election results

2019

2015

2011

Federal and statewide results in District 3

Historical results
All election results below took place prior to 2011 redistricting, and thus were under different district lines.

2007

2003

1999

1995

District officeholders since 1904

References

Virginia Senate districts
Hampton, Virginia
Poquoson, Virginia
Suffolk, Virginia
Gloucester County, Virginia
King and Queen County, Virginia
King William County, Virginia
New Kent County, Virginia
Isle of Wight County, Virginia
James City County, Virginia
Surry County, Virginia
York County, Virginia